Brooke Adams (born February 8, 1949) is an American actress, best known for her film roles in Days of Heaven (1978), Invasion of the Body Snatchers (1978) and The Dead Zone (1983).

Early life
Adams was born on February 8, 1949, in New York City, to Rosalind (née Gould), an actress, and Robert K. Adams, who was a producer, actor, and former vice president of CBS, as well as an unverified descendant of presidents John Adams and John Quincy Adams. Her sister is actress Lynne Adams. She attended the High School of Performing Arts and the School of American Ballet, and in her youth took dance classes at her aunt's studio in Montague, Michigan.

Career
After playing roles in television and low-budget films such as Shock Waves, Adams appeared in Days of Heaven (1978) and the remake of Invasion of the Body Snatchers (1978), for which she was nominated for the Saturn Award for Best Actress. She has also starred in the films Cuba (1979), The Dead Zone (1983), Key Exchange (1985) and Gas Food Lodging (1992), the latter earning her a nomination for the Independent Spirit Award for Best Supporting Female.

In 2002, she appeared in the romantic comedy Made-Up, which was written by her sister Lynne Adams, and directed by her husband Tony Shalhoub. Adams also appeared in the films At Last and The Legend of Lucy Keyes (both 2005), starred on Broadway in The Cherry Orchard, Lend Me a Tenor, Wendy Wasserstein's The Heidi Chronicles (1990), and guest-starred in Monk, the series starring her husband, appearing in five different episodes, playing four different roles. She also guest starred with him in an episode of Wings several years before.

Personal life
Adams has been married to actor Tony Shalhoub since 1992. They have two daughters, both of whom were adopted.

In May 2020, Shalhoub revealed that he and Adams had become ill with COVID-19 the previous month and after a "pretty rough few weeks" had recovered.

Filmography

Film

Television

References

External links 
 

20th-century American actresses
21st-century American actresses
Actresses from New York City
American film actresses
American television actresses
Living people
Year of birth missing (living people)